"For You" is a song by Staind from their 2001 album Break the Cycle, released as the fourth single from the album in 2001. The song is also featured on Staind's greatest hits-type compilation album The Singles: 1996–2006. It became the third single from Break the Cycle to chart on the Billboard Hot 100, when it peaked at number 63. It also charted on the Alternative Songs and Mainstream Rock Tracks charts at both number 3, respectively.

Track listing

Charts

References 

Staind songs
2002 singles
Music videos directed by Nigel Dick
2001 songs
Songs written by Aaron Lewis
Song recordings produced by Josh Abraham
Elektra Records singles
Songs written by Mike Mushok